"Chikni Chameli" is a song from the 2012 Indian Hindi action drama film Agneepath, directed by Karan Malhotra and produced by Karan Johar.  This song is based on F# melodic minor scale.  The song was first revealed on 16 December 2011 and features Katrina Kaif as the lead, along with Hrithik Roshan and Sanjay Dutt. The song was sung by Shreya Ghoshal and the dance choreographed by Ganesh Acharya.

Background 
It is a remake of the Marathi song "Kombdi Palali" from the film Jatra (2006), which was acted by Bharat Jadhav & Kranti Redkar and sung by Anand Shinde & Vaishali Samant.

The music is composed by the National award-winning Marathi composer duo Ajay and Atul Gogavale, known as Ajay–Atul, who had earlier worked on Natrang, Viruddh, Singham and My Friend Pinto.

Music video

Filming

Synopsis

Reception 
The song was well received by critics and audiences alike.

Awards and nominations

References 

Hindi film songs
Indian songs
2012 songs
Shreya Ghoshal songs
Songs with lyrics by Amitabh Bhattacharya
Songs with music by Ajay–Atul
Pop-folk songs